Muriel Baumeister (born January 24, 1972) is a German-Austrian film and television actress. She was born in Salzburg, Austria.

Selected filmography

 Rising to the Bait (1992)
  (1992, TV film)
  (1995, TV film)
 Life Is a Bluff (1996)
 Knockin' on Heaven's Door (1997)
 Un prete tra noi (1998, TV miniseries)
 Siska - Episode: Mord frei Haus (1999, TV series)
 Birds of a Feather (2000, short film)
 Enfermo de amor (2001, TV film)
 Die Überlebende (Survivor) (2001, short film)
 Dracula (2002, TV miniseries)
 The Amber Amulet (2004, TV miniseries)
 Bis in die Spitzen (2005, TV series)
 Kidnapping McKinsey (2006, TV film)
 A Risk Worth Taking (2008, TV film)
 Factor 8 (2009, TV film)
 Amfuem (2009, short film)
  (2013, TV film)

External links

Agency Hoestermann 
Fanpage of Muriel Baumeister  (Discontinued)
 Die Goldene Kamera 1994 (The Golden Camera Awards, 1993 win)

Austrian television actresses
1972 births
Living people